Farragut High School, located at 11237 Kingston Pike, serves as a high school in Farragut, a suburb of Knoxville, Tennessee. Knox County Schools, the unified Knox County, Tennessee school district, operates the school.

The school serves the majority of Farragut, portions south of Interstate 75.

The original Farragut High School, built in 1904, occupied a strip of land adjacent to Kingston Pike, becoming the first consolidated high school in Knox County. In 1976, the school relocated to its current location on a hill overlooking Farragut on the opposite side of Kingston Pike. A supermarket and strip mall dominate the original site, razed after the construction of the new buildings.

The school bears the name of Civil War hero David Glasgow Farragut, the Union admiral born in the area.

Academics
In September 2007 Farragut High School tied with White Station High School for the most National Merit Semifinalists (16) in the state. In 2008 Farragut had the largest number of National Merit Finalists in the state with a total of 16 students.In 2006 and 2005 Farragut made the Newsweek list of the top 5 percent of public high schools in the nation based on its AP program.

Athletics
The school fields a nationally ranked baseball team, claiming State Titles in 1982, 2003, 2004, 2006, 2008, 2009, 2010, 2011, 2014 and 2019, 2022. Their football team won a state championship in 2016. Their softball team won State Titles in 1982, 2021 and 2022. Their Dance team has won two consecutive national titles and Universal Dance Association’s National Dance Team Championship: 2018 and 2019. They also have won five consecutive state titles. The lacrosse team have also won multiple state championships.The school also fields varsity teams in the following sports: Basketball, Soccer, Lacrosse, Track and Field, Cross Country, Golf, Swimming, Girls Volleyball and Wrestling.

Notable alumni

Bill Bates, NFL player
Channon Christian, college student and murder victim
Neil Clabo, NFL player
Tyson Clabo, NFL player
John Davis, guitarist and lead singer of Superdrag
Nicky Delmonico, MLB player
Ben Garant, actor and comedian
Michael McKenry, MLB player
Chris Moneymaker, 2003 World Series of Poker Champion
Monica E. Peek, physician
Philip Pfeifer, MLB player
Matt Ramsey, baseball player
Nick Senzel,  MLB player
Jake Thomas, actor
Kyle Waldrop, MLB player

References

External links

 Farragut High School website

Public high schools in Tennessee
Schools in Knox County, Tennessee
Farragut, Tennessee
1904 establishments in Tennessee
Educational institutions established in 1904